Nicholas Hudson (born 9 November 1972) is an Australian former middle-distance runner who was the national champion over 800 metres at the Australian Athletics Championships in 2001-02.

References

1972 births
Living people
Place of birth missing (living people)
Australian male middle-distance runners